The Brădești oil field is an oil field located in Păușești, Vâlcea County. It was discovered in 1970 and developed by Petrom. It began production in 1971 and produces oil.

References

Oil fields in Romania